Venkat Reddy may refer to:

 Komatireddy Venkat Reddy, an Indian party legislator 
 Venkat K. Reddy, the chancellor of the University of Colorado Colorado Springs 
 Chintala Venkat Reddy, an Indian innovative organic farmer